Vidal Junction, California is an unincorporated community in the Sonoran Desert in San Bernardino County, California, United States.

It is near the California/Arizona state line immediately west of Parker at the intersection of U.S. Route 95 and State Route 62 a short distance north of Vidal. Though not a destination in its own right, Vidal Junction is a frequently used rest area and jumping-off point for travelers headed to Colorado River resort towns such as Lake Havasu and Laughlin, Nevada. It consists of little more than one gas station,  a trailer park, a closed diner and a California agricultural inspection station.

The ZIP Code is 92280 and the community is inside area code 760.

References

Unincorporated communities in San Bernardino County, California
Unincorporated communities in California